Fernando Andrés Santiago Varela (born 4 June 1973) is an Argentine-born Spanish football coach. He is the current head coach of I-League 2 club Bengaluru United.

Managerial career
Fernando Varela is an Argentine-born Spanish coach. He is a UEFA Pro Licence holder and from 2011 to 2014 he was Football coordinator of the Almeda CD in Cornellá de Llobregat. He has previously coached Catalalan CE Tecnofútbol in the lower leagues before joining Gokulam. He is the author of the book Futbol Inteligente (Smart Football). In 2018 March he appointed as the head coach of Indian top division club Gokulam Kerala and under him they won the Kerala Premier League. Before the I-League season he was sacked by the club due to personal reason but after revealed that the language was the problem because Varela was not good at English.

Gokulam Kerala
On 1 June 2019 it was announced that Fernando Varela would take over as head coach of I-League side Gokulam Kerala under him they won Durand cup one of the oldest football tournament in Asia.
On 16 June 2020 he left Gokulam due to salary issue and the performance of the club is not impressed the owners.

Churchill Brothers
After his successful spell with Gokulam Kerala, he moved to another I-League side Churchill Brothers in September 2020. Under his guidance, Churchill emerged as the runners-up of the 2020–21 I-League with 29 points. Although Churchill winning against Punjab, Gokulam Kerala were crowned champions courtesy of a better head-to-head record.

Sreenidi Deccan
On 20 April 2021, Varela was appointed the head coach of Sreenidi Deccan, one of the new I-League entrants.

Bengaluru United
On 13 March 2023, it was officially announced that he was appointed head coach of Bengaluru United.

Statistics

Managerial statistics

Honours

Manager
Gokulam Kerala
 Kerala Premier League: 2017–18 Durand Cup: 2019Churchill Brothers I-League runners-up: 2020–21FC Bengaluru United'''
Stafford Challenge Cup: 2023

References

1973 births
Living people
Spanish football managers
I-League managers
Gokulam Kerala FC managers
Spanish expatriate football managers
Expatriate football managers in India
Sreenidi Deccan FC head coaches
Churchill Brothers FC Goa managers